Pediah ( Pəḏāyā, "Yah has ransomed") was the High Priest of Solomon's Temple. Josephus wrote that after Axioramos (maybe Jehoiada) his son 'Phideas' became the new High Priest.

Patrilineal ancestry
as per 1 Chronicles 27 (up to Jehoiada) and then Josephus

Abraham
Isaac
Jacob
Levi
Kohath
Amram
Aaron
Eleazar
Phinehas
Abishua
Bukki
Uzzi
Zerahiah
Meraioth
Amariah
Ahitub
Zadok
Achim
Eliud
Benaiah
Jehoiada

Footnotes and references

8th-century BCE High Priests of Israel